Chen Chen (born May 15, 1979）is a Chinese host and presenter. She gained national prominence for hosting various popular programs on Dragon Television.

Career
Chen was a child actress during her schooling years. Initially she had no intentions of entering the entertainment industry and worked as a host for small-scale product launches and promotional events to earn extra money as a university student. A television director who was at such an event persuaded her to try hosting a television program. She was chosen to host the children's program Dragon Club (小神龙俱乐部) as she was fluent in both English and Mandarin Chinese. After receiving a positive response from viewers, she hosted the SMG's flagship entertainment and lifestyle program Entertainment Online (娱乐在线).

As she is bilingual, Chen has hosted and served as a translator at international events and conferences held in Shanghai, most notably the annual Shanghai International Film Festival. She co-hosted the 2015 Laureus World Sports Awards, which was held in Shanghai, together with actor Benedict Cumberbatch. The event drew much attention in China as Chen was the first Chinese national to host the awards and do it entirely in English without a translator.

Chen began shifting away from hosting television programs to producing in 2012. She was the producer and presenter of the critically-acclaimed program Heroes (闪亮的名字), which features the stories of ordinary citizens during significant periods of China's history, a departure from large-scale anniversary documentaries which typically glorified party or military achievements. The first season was nominated for Best Variety Program awards at the 2019 Shanghai Television Festival Magnolia Awards. Due to a positive reception from viewers, a second season was commissioned and it won the Best Literary/Cultural Program award at the biennial China Television Arts Starlight Awards.

Personal life
Chen graduated from Shanghai International Studies University with a bachelor's degree in international journalism and master's degree in communication studies. She was exposed to the television and entertainment industry from an early age as her aunt Chen Peiying (陈佩英), better known by her stage name Xiao Chen (小辰), was a presenter and producer during the 1960s to 1980s.

In January 2019, she appeared in the audience of the singing competition Super-Vocal season 1, and it was revealed that she was married to participant Yu Di, a singer-songwriter and vocal instructor at Shanghai Theatre Academy.

Filmography

References

1979 births
Living people
Chinese television presenters
People from Hangzhou
Shanghai International Studies University alumni